3 Dumb Clucks is a 1937 short subject directed by Del Lord starring American slapstick comedy team The Three Stooges (Moe Howard, Larry Fine and Curly Howard). It is the 22nd entry in the series released by Columbia Pictures starring the comedians, who released 190 shorts for the studio between 1934 and 1959.

Plot
The Stooges are in jail when their mother sends them a letter. The letter states that their father (Curly Howard, playing both himself and his father) has just become rich via an oil well, has left their mother, and that very same day is going to marry a young, gold-digging blonde named Daisy (Lucille Lund). The Stooges break out of jail and set off to try to stop the wedding. But since Curly and his father look exactly alike, Daisy ends up marrying the wrong man. The Stooges manage to escape the clutches of the criminals trying to kill them for their father's oil money, and rescue their father. With that they drag the unconscious father back to their mom.

Cast
 Curly Howard as Curly and Pop Howard (as Curly)
 Larry Fine as Larry
 Moe Howard as Moe
 Frank Austin as Prison Guard (uncredited)
 Lynton Brent as Hat Salesman (uncredited)
 Lew Davis as Wedding Guest (uncredited)
 Charles Dorety as Wedding Guest (uncredited)
 Eddie Laughton as Chopper's Henchman (uncredited)
 Lucille Lund as Daisy (uncredited)

Production notes
Filming for 3 Dumb Clucks commenced between February 1 and 5, 1937. It is a send-up of the feature film Three Smart Girls.

This is the third of sixteen Stooge shorts using the word "three" in the title, however, 3 Dumb Clucks is the only one to use the numeral "3". It was reworked in 1953 as Up in Daisy's Penthouse, using minimal stock footage from the original.

During the scene where Curly's father arrives for his wedding, two of the gold digger's henchmen dispose of him by throwing him down an elevator shaft. The prop men had padded the bottom of the shaft to cushion Curly's fall, but neglected to cover a protruding  panel. Curly was thrown down the shaft quickly, and landed head-first on the panel, tearing his scalp open. As the Stooges were workhorses at Columbia Pictures, Curly was not taken to the hospital. Instead, the studio physician was rushed to the set to apply several stitches to Curly's scalp. Some fresh hair was glued over the wound, and with a healthy dose of painkillers, the slightly wobbly Stooge was back in action within a few hours.

References

External links 
 
 
 3 Dumb Clucks at threestooges.net

1937 films
Columbia Pictures short films
The Three Stooges films
1930s English-language films
American black-and-white films
American slapstick comedy films
1937 comedy films
Films directed by Del Lord
1930s American films